The Tartan (formerly known as The Carnegie Tartan) is the original student newspaper of Carnegie Mellon University. Publishing since 1906, it is one of Carnegie Mellon's largest and oldest student organizations. It currently has over 170 student members, who contribute on a weekly basis. It is funded by advertisements and the university's student activities fee.

Sections
There are two sections in The Tartan. One is a standard broadsheet news section and the other is an entertainment, arts, and living  tabloid section called Pillbox.

News
The News section consists of the front page and two or three other pages of timely, campus-focused content covering events, accomplishments and disappointments of the student body. The section's semi-regular features include news analysis, personality profiles, investigative reporting, and trend reporting. Its regular features include news briefs, a preview of the university's lectures, featured photographs of campus events, and a weekly dose of topical statistics.

Forum
The Forum section is where Carnegie Mellon's campus discusses current issues. It contains letters to the editor, op-ed pieces, a "Leadership Perspectives" column that features input from student leaders, and articles from the campus community. It also contains one or more editorial pieces that are the general opinion of the Editorial Staff.

Science & Technology
This section covers the school's many achievements in the fields of robotics, computer science, biology, physics, and other fields, as well as lectures and events with a technology or science slant. As Carnegie Mellon is a research university, The Tartan's "SciTech" section holds a special significance to the newspaper's total university coverage. Envisioned in 2000, the SciTech section originally ran on alternate weeks with a Business section. However, in 2003 the Business section was discontinued and SciTech became a weekly section of the newspaper.

Sports
This section covers the weekly games, home and away, of Carnegie Mellon's sports teams, including intramural ones. Its features include analysis of professional sports leagues, commentaries, and a schedule of upcoming games and events.

Pillbox
Pillbox is The Tartans arts, living, and entertainment section. As an insert accompanying the broadsheet, it has its own comics editor in addition to a section editor. Pillbox covers the latest restaurant openings in the Oakland, Shadyside, and Squirrel Hill neighborhoods, campus fashion, on-campus concerts, dramatic performances, and organizations. It also contains music and movie reviews, and larger feature articles that encompass a greater scope.

The second section of the paper has undergone several iterations, especially in the past 15 years. In the 1980s, the subsections included Features and Diversions. Features contained information on student living, campus life, and city life. Diversions focused specifically on Arts and Entertainment. At this time the second section was also a broadsheet.

In 2000, as part of the newspaper's redesign several changes were made. Since the lines between Features and Diversions were already blurred, they were merged into an Arts and Living Section. SciTech and Business made up another subsection. Eventually Business was discontinued, and Arts and Living became a tabloid section, Pillbox.

Comics
There is a comics section in Pillbox, with many student-drawn comics and a few syndicated comics.

Staff
The staff of The Tartan comprises two major levels, the Editorial Staff and regular staff.

Editorial Staff
The Editorial Staff constitutes the core of The Tartans contributors, making decisions about the articles, photographs, and art pieces submitted by the regular staff. The Editorial Staff is divided into editors and managers. Editors deal directly with the assigning, production, and processing of content, while managers coordinate their staffs to provide a service to the publication.

As a general rule, people are voted into the Editorial Staff by their peers.

Editorial Board
The Editorial Board is a subgroup of the Editorial Staff, charged with formulating and communicating the newspaper's formal opinion every week. Each issue contains between one and three editorials, marked "From the Editorial Board," all of which are written by Editorial Board members and vetted by the entire Board before publication. The Board is appointed by the Editor-in-Chief and approved by a majority vote of the Editorial Staff.

Regular Staff
Students are considered a junior staff writer after joining the newspaper. After contributing to six issues or having two published articles in each of two separate sections, the student becomes a full staff writer. After a year of regular contribution, the staff writer is eligible to become a senior staff writer (a position which confers no tangible benefits, but senior staff do get their names in the masthead each week).

Events and controversies

A brief independence: 2002–2004
In 2002, The Tartan'''s leadership decided to leave the student funding process of Carnegie Mellon University. Advertising revenues were healthy, and the paper's leadership was confident that the paper could remain independent so long as future leadership maintained a strong focus on maintaining and growing revenue from advertising and subscriptions. Breaking away was also an attempt to remove the ethical burden of reporting on the same entities that allocated funds to the newspaper. The paper failed to grow and maintain its advertising income, and accumulated a large amount of debt by 2004. The Tartan rejoined the student funding process in the spring of 2004.

Missing website: 2004
In the spring of 2004, a disgruntled staff member accessed The Tartans servers and removed the code for The Tartans Web site, along with the content of the site, shortly after leaving a meeting in which the editor-in-chief failed to nominate him for a contributing editor position. A complaint was filed with campus police, and the University held a disciplinary hearing, in which the committee determined the code belonged to the former staff member. Since then, The Tartan has rebuilt its internal and external Web sites from scratch.

Controversy: April - November 2004The Tartan has traditionally published an annual joke issue called the "Natrat" (Tartan spelled backwards) on April Fool's Day. In the 2004 edition, a comic containing a racial slur and a joke about a racist hate crime, along with other items deemed offensive by much of the community, such as a poem about the fatal rape of a woman with an ice skate blade, was published. Jim Puls, the editor-in-chief and Alex Meseguer, the managing editor resigned in the wake of the ensuing media attention and campus outcry.Furor over First Amendment: CMU editors assailed over spoof paper Bob Rost, the artist of the offending cartoon was also dismissed from the newspaper.

In November 2004, The Tartan declined to run an advertisement submitted by conservative writer David Horowitz. Horowitz has gained publicity by placing or attempting to place similar ads in a number of student newspapers across the country. This action caused The Tartan'' to once again gain media attention, this time drawing fire from conservatives who viewed the paper as having a liberal agenda.

References

External links
The Tartan

Tartan, The
Carnegie Mellon University
Tartan, The